Kostanj is a small village in the Municipality of Kamnik in the Upper Carniola region of Slovenia.

Church
The local church is dedicated to Saint Dorothea.

Notable people
Notable people that were born or lived in Kostanj include:
Pavel Pestotnik (1879–1955), politician and organizer of the Sokol movement

References

External links
Kostanj on Geopedia

Populated places in the Municipality of Kamnik